Thank You...For F.U.M.L. (Funking Up My Life) is an album by trumpeter Donald Byrd featuring compositions by The Blackbyrds which was released on the Elektra label in 1978. The album marked a distinct movement away from jazz toward more rhythm and blues and disco influences.

Track listing
All compositions by Art Posey, Josef Powell and Melvin Ragin except where noted 
 Thank You for Funking Up My Life" (Posey, Powell, Kevin Toney) – 4:15
 "Sunning in Your Loveshine" (Posey, Powell, Orville Saunders) – 5:40
 "Your Love Is My Ecstasy" – 5:03
 "Loving You" (Joe Hall) – 4:48
 "Have You Heard the News?" – 4:42
 "In Love with Love" – 4:48
 "Cristo Redentor" (Duke Pearson) – 4:45
 "Close Your Eyes and Look Within" (Posey, Powell, Saunders) – 5:15

Personnel
Donald Byrd – trumpet
Greg Phillinganes – piano
Paul Jackson Jr., Rick Littlefield, Wah Wah Watson – guitar
Ed Watkins – electric bass
Anthony Cox – drums
Donald Byrd, Jim Gilstrap, John Lehman, Art Posey, Josef Powell, Syreeta Wright, Ralph Turnbough, Stephanie Spruill, John Lehman, Lisa Roberts, Patricia Henderson, Marlena Jeter, Maxine Anderson, Angela Winbush – vocals

References

Elektra Records albums
Donald Byrd albums
1978 albums